The 2010 Men's Asian Games Rugby sevens Tournament was held in Guangzhou University Town Stadium, Guangzhou, China from November 21 to November 23, 2010.

Squads

Results
All times are China Standard Time (UTC+08:00)

Preliminary round

Pool A

Pool B

Final round

Quarterfinals

5–8 placing

Semifinals

7th/8th placing

5th/6th placing

Bronze medal match

Gold medal match

Final standing

References

Results

External links
Official Website

Men sevens